National Partnership (NS) was the only authorized political party in the Protectorate of Bohemia and Moravia. Membership was mandatory for all Czech male full-aged citizens of the Protectorate.

The party was established as a reaction to the German occupation of Czechoslovakia and was the basis for Czech collaboration during World War II. Two parties — the Party of National Unity and the National Labour Party — merged on appeal of President Emil Hácha on 21 March 1939 and established the National Partnership as a nationwide party. On 6 April 1939, the party was declared the only political party in Bohemia and Moravia (except for the Nazi Party, which was exclusively for Germans).

The Prime Minister of Bohemia and Moravia Alois Eliáš was in communication with the Czechoslovak government-in-exile and helped the Czech Resistance movement until he was executed in June 1942.

After the assassination of Reinhard Heydrich in 1942, Emanuel Moravec gained propaganda influence. After 15 January 1943, the party ceased to fulfill the functions of a political party and became a larger propaganda machine of the Nazi regime.

Politicians
The most prominent politicians of the party:
 Alois Eliáš (1890–1942), a former Czechoslovak General who was executed for his secret contacts with the Czechoslovak government-in-exile in 1942; Prime Minister from 1939 to 1941.
 Ladislav Karel Feierabend, Minister of Agriculture from 1939 to 1940. Joined the London-based Czechoslovak government in 1940.
 Jiří Havelka, Minister of Traffic from 1939 to 1941.
 Josef Ježek, Interior Minister from 1939 to 1942.
 Jan Kapras, Minister of Education from 1939 to 1942.
 Josef Kalfus (1880–1956), Minister of Finance from 1939 to 1945.
 Josef Nebeský, Party President from 1939 to 1941.
 Josef Fousek (1875–1942), Party President from 1941 to 1942.
 Jaroslav Krejčí (1892–1956), Minister of Justice from 1939 to 1945, as well as Minister President from 1942 to 1945.
 Jindřich Kamenický, Minister of Traffic from 1941 to 1945.
 Walter Bertsch, Minister of Economics from 1942 to 1945.
 Richard Bienert (1881–1949), Interior Minister from 1942 to 1945, as well as the last Minister President in 1945.
 Adolf Hrubý (1893–1951), Minister of Agriculture from 1942 to 1945.
 Tomáš Krejčí, Führer (Vůdce) of the Party from 1942 to 1945.
 Emanuel Moravec, Minister of Education from 1942 to 1945.

References

Protectorate of Bohemia and Moravia
Parties of one-party systems
Political parties established in 1939
Political parties disestablished in 1945
Czech collaborators with Nazi Germany
Nazi parties
Banned far-right parties
Anti-communist parties
Far-right political parties in the Czech Republic